FC Aral Nokis is Uzbekistani football club based in Nukus. Currently it plays in Uzbekistan First League.

History

Before joining Uzbek League in 1992, Amudarya Nukus played in Soviet Second League, regional zones in 1976–1984.
In 1991 club was renamed to Aral Nukus. Club played in Uzbek League 3 consequent season 1992–1994, relegating to Uzbekistan First League at the end of 1994 season.

In 1999 Aral Nukus gained promotion to top level again, playing in Uzbek League 2 seasons: 2000 and 2001. In 2001 season club finished 17th and relegated to lower division.

Currently club plays in Uzbekistan First League, conference "West". In March 2012 before start of First League season, club was renamed from Jaykhun Nukus to Aral Nokis again.

Historical names
 1976–1989: Amudarya Nukus
 1990: Aralvodstroevez
 1991–1999: Aral Nukus
 2000–: Turon Nukus
 2007–2012: Jaykhun Nukus
 2012: Aral Nokis

Stadium
Club home ground is Turan Stadium which holds 9,300 spectators.

Managers

 Quvvat Tureev (1999–)
 Nagmetulla Kutibayev (2013–2016)
 Temur Turdiev (2016–)

References

External links
 FC Aral Nukus matches and results – soccerway

Football clubs in Uzbekistan
Association football clubs established in 1976